Gerihun is a small town in Bo District in southern Sierra Leone. In late April 1996, an attack on the town led its residents and the more than 20,000 inhabitants of a displaced camp in the vicinity to flee to Bo.

Notable people
Albert Joe Demby (1934-2021)

References

Populated places in Sierra Leone